General Hunter may refer to:

Archibald Hunter (1856–1936), British Army general
Charles H. Hunter (soldier) (1817–1870), Pennsylvania Militia brigadier general in the American Civil War
David Hunter (1802–1886), Union Army major general
Frank O'Driscoll Hunter (1894–1982), U.S. Army Air Force major general
George King Hunter (1855–1940), U.S. Army major general
Martin Hunter (British Army officer) (1757–1846), British Army general
Peter Hunter (British Army officer) (1746–1805), British Army lieutenant general
Robert Hunter (colonial administrator) (1666–1734), British Army general

See also
Aylmer Hunter-Weston (1864–1940), British Army lieutenant general
Attorney General Hunter (disambiguation)